Hunter Street is a Lower City collector road in Hamilton, Ontario, Canada. It is a one-way street (Westbound) that starts West of Locke Street at Hill Street Park and ends two blocks East of Victoria Avenue at Emerald Street. Hunter Street is a two-way street between Victoria and Emerald Streets.

History

Hunter Street is named after Peter Hunter Hamilton (1800–1857), landowner and businessman and half brother of city founder George Hamilton. Originally, sections of Hunter Street were called William Street after King William IV and Peel Street after the British PM, Sir Robert Peel.

Central Public School building on Hunter Street West was built in 1853. This school was built to accommodate 1,000 students, was the largest graded school in Upper Canada, and became the only public school in Hamilton, at the time of its opening in 1853. The building's original final proportioned classical design, by the firm Cumberland & Ridout, was extensively remodelled in 1890 by the Hamilton architect, James Balfour. His alterations, including a steeply pitched roof, certain round arched windows and a heightened central tower, created an edifice in conformity with the late Victorian tastes. The building is designated under the Ontario Heritage Act.

Landmarks
Note: Listing of landmarks from West to East.
Hill Street Park
Players' Guild of Hamilton, Inc. (theatre) 
Central Public School Building, w/ clock tower
James Street South Shopping district
Hamilton GO Transit station, Original site of the Toronto, Hamilton and Buffalo Railway (1892–1987)
The Fontainebleu (18-storey apartment building)
Access Community Church of God 7th Day
Central Memorial Recreation Centre

Communities
Note: Listing of neighbourhoods from West to East. 
Kirkendall
Durand
Corktown
Stinson

Roads that are parallel with Hunter Street
Lower City roads:
Burlington Street, West–East
Barton Street, West/East
Cannon Street, West/East
Wilson Street 
King William Street
King Street, West/East
Main Street, West/East; - Queenston Road
Jackson Street, West/East
Hunter Street, West/East 
Augusta Street
Charlton Avenue, West/East 
Aberdeen Avenue
Niagara Escarpment (Mountain) Roads:
Concession Street
Queensdale Avenue West/ East
Scenic Drive - Fennell Avenue, West/East
Sanatorium Road
Mohawk Road, West/East
Limeridge Road West/East
Lincoln M. Alexander Parkway - Mud Street, (Hamilton City Road 11)
Stone Church Road, West/East
; Rymal Road, West/East
Twenty Road

Roads that cross Hunter Street

Note: Listing of streets from West to East.
Locke Street, South
Queen Street, South
Hess Street, South
Caroline Street, South
Bay Street, South
MacNab Street, South
James Street, South
Hughson Street, South
John Street, South
Catharine Street, South
Ferguson Avenue, South
Wellington Street, South
Victoria Avenue, South

Images

References

MapArt Golden Horseshoe Atlas - page 647 - Grids H10, H11, H12, H13

External links

Downtown Hamilton
Durand Neighbourhood
Kirkendall Neighbourhood
Locke Street.com
Locke Street South Shopping District
Google Maps: Hunter Street (Hybrid)

Roads in Hamilton, Ontario